Martin Luther King Jr. Academic Magnet for Health Sciences and Engineering at Pearl High School (or simply MLK Magnet) is a public magnet high school located in Nashville, Tennessee. MLK includes grades 7–12, and students enter through a lottery process similar to the other magnet schools in Nashville.

History 
Pearl High School was a school for African American students. Franklin Gatewood Smith served as its principal.

The school building that houses MLK was built in 1937 to house Pearl High School, an African-American school. The building was commissioned in 1936 by the Public Works Administration (PWA) and was designed by McKissack and McKissack, a prominent African-American architectural firm. The building features a red brick veneer and Art Deco stylistic elements, in an architectural style commonly used by the PWA and known as PWA Moderne. The building was expanded in 1945 and 1963, again with designs by McKissack and McKissack.

The school was Nashville's first secondary magnet for grades 7-12. After Pearl High moved numerous times, settling at 17th Avenue in the 1950s and eventually to its current location at Pearl Cohn Comprehensive High School, MLK Magnet, originally named Martin Luther King, Jr. Magnet High School for the Health Sciences and Engineering, opened its doors in August 1986 at the former Pearl High with only grades 7–9, adding one grade per year until 1990 when it had its first graduating class of 25 students.  A gymnasium was added to the building in 1995, designed by the Nashville architectural firm of Street, Dixon, Rick. The school's current name was adopted in 2001. The building is listed on the National Register of Historic Places.

Student Body 
MLK possesses one of the most diverse student bodies in Nashville, with a majority enrollment of 55% and an enrollment of economically disadvantaged students of 19%. Over time, the faculty and student populations have diversified, along with the changing demographics of Nashville.

Distinctions 
MLK is known for its academic program, focusing on math, science, and engineering. The school also has exceptional art, foreign language, band, and orchestra programs.  This academic magnet school only offers courses in Honors and Advanced Placement (AP) with the exception of physical education, certain engineering, and critical thinking courses. In addition, MLK offers the unique Practica program as well as advanced and dual enrollment courses along with a partnership with the School for Science and Math at Vanderbilt University.

In the 2007–2008 academic year MLK received the Siemens Award for Advanced Placement, for one of the best scientific and math-based academic programs in the country. The school also has a renowned quiz bowl team - in 2007–2009, the school placed first at state competitions, second at the PACE national tournament in 2007, 13th at NAQT Nationals in 2007, and 7th at NAQT Nationals in 2008. In addition, the MLK Magnet Mock Trial team reached the State competition in 2009 and 2011. They placed 7th in 2011 and took home Best Advocate for the Defense, Best Defense Witness.

MLK Magnet is ranked in the top 113 of Newsweek's and U.S. News & World Report's annual rankings of the top public high schools in America and 2nd overall in Tennessee.

It was announced in April 2013 that First Lady Michelle Obama will be the commencement speaker for Martin Luther King Jr. Magnet School's graduation.

Enrollment 
Students who want to go to MLK must have the academic requirements of 85 or above in all courses of the 1st semester. They must also receive "On track" or "Mastered" in their TN Ready Test of the previous year or current year. They can also qualify if they have good map scores of May  (with grades) Head middle has a direct pathway to MLK if requirements are met, also Rosa Parks. Students can also enter a lottery if they do bot a have a pathway to MLK. (requirements must be meet as well to enter lottery)

(School's rank within Tennessee given in parentheses)

Sports 
MLK offers a variety of sports and competes regularly, as shown by numerous awards and rankings. MLK has also won many TSSAA championships. MLK has won two state championships in boys' basketball (1991,1996) a state championship in boys' track in 2005, with Anderson Skaggs as MVP, 2009 and 2010, a state championship in boys' cross-country in 2008 and 2009, a state runner-up in boys' track in 2004, and a state championship in doubles tennis in 2007. Recently, the MLK Girls' Track Team has won TSSAA State Track Meet for three years straight, 2010, 2011, and 2012.

Varsity Sports:

Boys'/girls' tennis
Baseball
Cross country
Boys'/girls' track
Ice hockey
Boys'/girls' soccer
Softball
Bowling
Cheerleading
Football (with Pearl-Cohn High School)
Golf
Mascot
Swimming
Volleyball
Wrestling
Ultimate
Ping pong

Junior Varsity Sports:
Boys'/girls' basketball
Volleyball
    
Freshmen Sports:
Boys'/girls' basketball
Track (Boys)
Volleyball
    
Middle School Sports:
Boys'/girls' basketball
Cheerleading
Boys'/girls' soccer
Boys'/girls' track
Volleyball
Wrestling

Rivals 
MLK Magnet's sports and academic rival is Hume-Fogg High School located less than 2 miles from the school.

Notable alumni 
 Jim Gilliam, Major League Baseball player (1953-1966), 4-time World Series champion
 Cary Ann Hearst, musician
 Les Hunter, professional All-Star basketball player, NCAA champion.
 Ted McClain, professional basketball player
 Dee Rees, screenwriter
 Mageina Tovah, actress known for her role in Spider-Man 2 and Spider-Man 3 movies as Ursula Ditkovitch and on TV show Joan of Arcadia as Glynis Figliola.
 Vivien Thomas, who helped to develop surgical techniques to treat blue baby syndrome and was subject of documentary "Partners of the Heart," attended Pearl High School in 1920s
 Clay Travis, analyst for Fox Sports
 Perry Wallace, first African American SEC basketball player
 Gerald Robinson, professional basketball player for AS Monaco Basket

References

External links 

 MLK Magnet Website

Public high schools in Tennessee
Schools in Nashville, Tennessee
Magnet schools in Tennessee
Public middle schools in Tennessee
PWA Moderne architecture
Public Works Administration in Tennessee